Swopnodanay (On the Wings of Dreams) is a 2007 Bengali drama film directed by Golam Rabbany Biplob. It was Bangladesh's submission to the 80th Academy Awards for the Academy Award for Best Foreign Language Film, but was not nominated.

Plot

Cast
 Mahmuduzzaman Babu as Fazlu   
 Rokeya Prachy as Matka   
 Fazlur Rahman Babu as Siraj  
 Momena Choudhury
 Shamima Islam Tusti as Rehana   
 Shoma as Asma
 Golam Rasul Babu
 Shah Alam Kiran 
 Gulshan Ara
 Fargana Milton
 Ratan
 Shoma
 Shamoly

Awards
Best Director 
Asian New Talent Competition
10th Shanghai International Film Festival, 2007

Silver Peacock 
38th International Film Festival of India-GOA, 2007

Meril Prothom Alo Awards
 Best Film

See also
 List of Bangladeshi films of 2007
 Cinema of Bangladesh
 List of submissions to the 80th Academy Awards for Best Foreign Language Film

References

External links

2007 films
Bengali-language Bangladeshi films
Bangladeshi drama films
Films scored by Bappa Mazumdar
2000s Bengali-language films
2007 drama films
 
Best Film Bachsas Award winners
Impress Telefilm films